1887 in sports describes the year's events in world sport.

Athletics
USA Outdoor Track and Field Championships

American football
College championship
 College football national championship – Yale Bulldogs
Events
 The rules are changed so that gametime is set at two halves of 45 minutes each (as in Association football).  Two paid officials, a referee and an umpire, are mandated for each game.

Association football
England
 FA Cup final – Aston Villa 2–0 West Bromwich Albion at The Oval
 Barnsley FC and Blackpool FC are founded
Germany
 Hamburger SV founded as one of the oldest clubs in Germany
Scotland
 Scottish Cup final – Hibernian 2–1 Dumbarton

Australian rules football
Events
 Carlton Football Club wins the Victorian Football Association premiership
 Norwood Football Club wins the South Australian Football Association premiership
 Unions Football Club wins the Western Australian Football Association premiership

Baseball
National championship
 National League v. American Association – Detroit Wolverines (NL) defeats Saint Louis Cardinals (AA) 10 games to 5
Events
 The two major leagues agree to a unified set of rules.  
 The National Colored Base Ball League plays for a few weeks before folding.
 Five black men play in the International League, the highest minor league, the high-water mark in racial integration of professional baseball.

Boxing
Lineal world champions
 World Heavyweight Championship – John L. Sullivan
 World Middleweight Championship – Jack Nonpareil Dempsey
 World Lightweight Championship – Jack McAuliffe

Cricket
Events
 The English cricket team in Australia in 1886–87, generally known as Alfred Shaw's XI, is described by Wisden as "one of the strongest that ever left England for the Colonies". The team plays 10 first-class matches, winning 6 with 2 draws and 2 defeats (both against New South Wales). England win both Test matches played by 13 runs and 71 runs respectively.
England
 Champion County –  Surrey
 Most runs – W. G. Grace 2,062 @ 54.26 (HS 183*)
 Most wickets – George Lohmann 154 @ 15.61 (BB 8–36)
Australia
 Most runs – Arthur Shrewsbury 721 @ 48.06 (HS 236)
 Most wickets – Charlie Turner 70 @ 7.68 (BB 8–32)

Gaelic football
 7 February — Irish forms of football are formally arranged into an organised playing code by the Gaelic Athletic Association, the rules being drawn up by Maurice Davin and published in the United Ireland magazine.  The GAA seeks to promote traditional Irish sports, such as hurling and to reject "foreign" (particularly English) imports.
 Limerick GAA wins the inaugural All-Ireland Senior Football Championship.

Golf
Major tournaments
 British Open – Willie Park junior
Other tournaments
 British Amateur – Horace Hutchinson

Horse racing
England
 Grand National – Gamecock
 1,000 Guineas Stakes – Reve d'Or
 2,000 Guineas Stakes – Enterprise
 The Derby – Merry Hampton
 The Oaks – Reve d'Or
 St. Leger Stakes – Kilwarlin
Australia
 Melbourne Cup – Dunlop
Canada
 Queen's Plate – Bonnie Duke
Ireland
 Irish Grand National – Eglentine
 Irish Derby Stakes – Pet Fox
USA
 Kentucky Derby – Montrose
 Preakness Stakes – Dunboyne
 Belmont Stakes – Hanover

Hurling
 Tipperary GAA wins the first All–Ireland Senior Hurling Championship

Ice hockey
 February 25 - The Montreal Hockey Club defeats Montreal Victorias 1–0 to win the 1887 Montreal Winter Carnival Ice Hockey Tournament.
 March 11 - The Montreal Crystals defeat the Montreal Victorias 3–2 to win the inaugural 1887 AHAC championship on the final challenge of the season, despite having a record of two wins and four losses.

Rowing
The Boat Race
 26 March — Cambridge wins the 44th Oxford and Cambridge Boat Race

Rugby football
Home Nations Championship
 Scotland wins the 1887 Home Nations Championship, which is the 5th series

Softball
Events
 George Hancock invents an indoor baseball game that would become known as softball in Chicago, Illinois (USA) on November 24.

Tennis
Events
 American champion Richard D. Sears retires from the sport after winning the US singles title for the seventh successive time, a record that still stands
England
 Wimbledon Men's Singles Championship – Herbert Lawford (GB) defeats Ernest Renshaw (GB) 1–6 6–3 3–6 6–4 6–4
 Wimbledon Women's Singles Championship – Lottie Dod (GB) defeats Blanche Bingley (GB) 6–2 6–0
USA
 American Men's Singles Championship – Richard D. Sears (USA) defeats Henry Slocum (USA) 6–1 6–3 6–2
 American Women's Singles Championship – Ellen Hansell (USA) defeats Laura Knight (USA) 6–1 6–0

Yacht racing
America's Cup
 The New York Yacht Club retains the America's Cup as Volunteer defeats British challenger Thistle, of the Royal Clyde Yacht Club, 2 races to 0

References

 
Sports by year